On 26 April 2022, a suicide bombing hit a van near the University of Karachi's Confucius Institute, killing three Chinese academics and their Pakistani driver. The Balochistan Liberation Army, claimed responsibility, saying that the perpetrator was the organization's first female suicide bomber.

Of the three Chinese killed, one was the director of the University's Confucius Institute. The other two were teachers. China losing confidence in Pakistan's ability to secure Chinese nationals, has since requested permission to deploy Chinese private security contractors to Pakistan.

Perpetrator
The Balochistan Liberation Army, a group internationally designated as a terrorist organization, claimed responsibility for the bombing, which it said was done to discourage Chinese development programs in the region.

The bomber was identified as Shari Baloch, a 30-year-old female and secondary school science teacher from Kech District in Balochistan. She held bachelor's and master's degrees in education from the Allama Iqbal Open University, and had also obtained a master's degree in zoology from the University of Balochistan. She had reportedly enrolled in another postgraduate degree at the University of Karachi months before the attack, but was not reported to be a student there at the time. Shari had a daughter and son, both reportedly aged five, with her husband Habitan Bashir Baloch, who is also from Kech and a dentist. In 2019, Shari Baloch landed a job in the Balochistan Education Department and was employed at a government secondary school in Kalatak, near Turbat, where she taught science to female students. However, she had been absent from the school since six months before the attack and had been served a show-cause notice, to which she had not responded. Her husband, Habitan, was also a lecturer at the Makran Medical College, and was undertaking a postgraduate degree in public health from the Jinnah Sindh Medical University. Her husband was reported to be involved in a training programme at Karachi's Jinnah Hospital, and had been staying in a hotel near the hospital at the time. The couple had rented an apartment in Gulistan-e-Johar, where Shari had been living for the past three years.

Shari Baloch's family has been described as "well-established, educated with no previous affiliation with any Baloch insurgent group." However, Shari herself had remained a member of the Baloch Students Organisation (Azad) group during her student life. Her motivations for the attack could not be ascertained, as no one in her immediate family had reportedly been a victim of human rights abuses. Hours before the attack, Baloch posted a farewell message on her Twitter account. Soon after the bombing occurred, her husband posted a Tweet in which he eulogised and praised Shari, describing her action as a "selfless act". Her husband's whereabouts were not known immediately after the attack, with raids being carried out by security forces to apprehend him and other suspected facilitators. On 27 April, Habitan Bashir Baloch, husband of Karachi University suicide bomber Shari Baloch, was arrested by security personnel, a day after the explosion, news agency ANI reported citing Pakistan's ARY News. Habitan is being interrogated by authorities. In a briefing chaired by Pakistan's interior minister, Rana Sanaullah, China's ambassador to Pakistan was apprised about the latest developments in the case.

Authorities in Pakistan said they have arrested a key orchestrator of the Karachi University bombing in July, the attack was the result of the combined efforts of two insurgent groups, the Balochistan Liberation Front (BLF) and the Balochistan Liberation Army (BLA).

Reactions
The attack was strongly condemned by Pakistan, China, Saudi Arabia, United Arab Emirates,  Oman, India, Kuwait, the United States, European Union, United Nations and United Nation Security Council.

References

2022 in Sindh
2022 murders in Pakistan
2020s in Karachi
21st-century mass murder in Pakistan
April 2022 crimes in Asia
April 2022 events in Pakistan
Mass murder in 2022
School bombings in Asia
Suicide bombings in 2022
Terrorist incidents in Pakistan in 2022
Anti-Chinese violence in Asia
Chinese people murdered abroad
Balochistan Liberation Army attacks
Female suicide bombers
Suicide bombings in Karachi
University and college killings in Asia
China–Pakistan relations
Confucius Institute
Bombing